Karin Szymko (born May 11, 1979 in Merton, Greater London) is a female British former artistic gymnast.

Gymnastics career
Szymko represented England in four events at the 1994 Commonwealth Games in Victoria, British Columbia, Canada. She won a gold medal in the team event.

References

External links
 

Living people
1979 births
British female artistic gymnasts
English female artistic gymnasts
Commonwealth Games medallists in gymnastics
Commonwealth Games gold medallists for England
Gymnasts at the 1994 Commonwealth Games
Medallists at the 1994 Commonwealth Games